In computer sciences, the separation of protection and security is a design choice. Wulf et al. identified protection as a mechanism and security as a policy, therefore making the protection-security distinction a particular case of the separation of mechanism and policy principle.  Many frameworks consider both as security controls of varying types. For example, protection mechanisms would be considered technical controls, while a policy would be considered an administrative control.

Overview 
The adoption of this distinction in a computer architecture usually means that protection is provided as a fault tolerance mechanism by hardware/firmware and kernel, whereas the operating system and applications implement their security policies. In this design, security policies rely therefore on the protection mechanisms and on additional cryptography techniques.

The major hardware approach for security or protection is the use of hierarchical protection domains. A prominent example of this approach is the ring architecture with "supervisor mode" and "user mode". Such an approach adopts a policy already at the lower levels (hardware/firmware/kernel), restricting the rest of the system to rely on it. Therefore, the choice to distinguish between protection and security in the overall architecture design implies rejection of the hierarchical approach in favour of another one, the capability-based addressing.

Examples of models with protection and security separation include access matrix, UCLA Data Secure Unix, take-grant and filter. Such separation is not found in models like high-water mark, Bell–LaPadula (original and revisited), information flow, strong dependency and constraints.

See also
Capability-based addressing
Computer security policy

Notes

References
Houdek, M. E., Soltis, F. G., and Hoffman, R. L. 1981. IBM System/38 support for capability-based addressing. In Proceedings of the 8th ACM International Symposium on Computer Architecture. ACM/IEEE, pp. 341–348.
Intel Corporation (2002) The IA-32 Architecture Software Developer’s Manual, Volume 1: Basic Architecture
Carl E. Landwehr Formal Models for Computer Security  Volume 13,  Issue 3  (September 1981) pp. 247 – 278
 Swift, Michael M; Brian N. Bershad, Henry M. Levy, Improving the reliability of commodity operating systems,  ACM Transactions on Computer Systems (TOCS), v.23 n.1, p. 77-110, February 2005
  

Computer security
Dichotomies